Xbox Game Studios (previously known as Microsoft Studios, Microsoft Game Studios, and Microsoft Games) is an American video game publisher and part of the Microsoft Gaming division based in Redmond, Washington. It was established in March 2000, spun out from an internal Games Group, for the development and publishing of video games for Microsoft Windows. It has since expanded to include games and other interactive entertainment for the namesake Xbox platforms, Windows Mobile and other mobile platforms, and web-based portals.

History

As Microsoft Games and Microsoft Game Studios (2000–2011) 

In the early 1990s, Microsoft published a few video games. It published subLOGIC's Microsoft Flight Simulator and several Microsoft Entertainment Pack compilations of minigames, but was best known for MS-DOS and Microsoft Windows. In 1992, the company began increasing its focus on games. It announced Microsoft Golf for Windows, based on Access Software's Links, and expanded the games division from two to six people with the intention of commissioning more products from other developers.

Microsoft acquired FASA Interactive in 1999 for its MechWarrior game series, Access Software, and Aces Game Studio, which worked on Flight Simulator. The Games Group had also established long-term publishing deals with developers like Ensemble Studios (Age of Empires, Age of Mythology), and Digital Anvil (Starlancer). Under Microsoft, FASA Interactive was renamed FASA Studio, and Access Software became Salt Lake Games Studio.

Microsoft transitioned the Games Group into a wholly separate division named Microsoft Games around March 2000, along with other consolidation of games-related projects within Microsoft. This came alongside the public announcement of the first Xbox console, with Microsoft Games to serve as a developer and publisher of titles for both Xbox and Windows. Robbie Bach, who held executive positions in Microsoft's entertainment divisions, was named senior vice-president while Ed Fries, a member of the former Games Group and instrumental for some of its acquisitions, was named as vice-president of the new division. Shane Kim served as the division's general manager. In 2001, the division was renamed Microsoft Game Studios (MGS).

FASA Studio and Salt Lake Games Studio remained with Microsoft Game Studios. Digital Anvil and Ensemble Studios were acquired by Microsoft in 2000 and 2001, respectively. One of the first major studio acquisitions following the division's formation was Bungie in June 2000, in the midst of its development of Halo: Combat Evolved. With the acquisition, Halo, which had been planned for release on personal computers, became a Microsoft-published title as well as a launch title for the Xbox on its release in 2001. Turn 10 Studios was established in 2001 for work on the Forza series of racing games. In September 2002, Microsoft Game Studios acquired Rare, who had previously extensively developed for Nintendo platforms. In 2003, Microsoft recognized that the EA Sports label was in a far stronger position to develop sports games for the Xbox console, and among realignment steps, laid off about 78 employees within Microsoft Game Studios that were developing sports games in-house, and sold Salt Lake Games Studio, now named Indie Games to Take-Two Interactive in 2004, where it became Indie Built.

Peter Moore was named in 2003 as vice-president of Microsoft's Home and Entertainment Division, which included MGS, the Xbox division, and Microsoft's home hardware market, reporting to Bach. In addition to pulling big publishers like Electronic Arts to the Xbox platform, Moore tried to push the Xbox in Japan by courting Japanese developers with support from MGS publishing. Such games included Phantom Dust and Blinx: The Time Sweeper. Around 2004, MGS established Carbonated Games as an internal studio for the development of casual games for Microsoft's web games portal MSN Games, on the chat client MSN Messenger, and on the Xbox Live platform. Kim and Fries were instrumental for securing MGS' publishing deal with Lionhead Studios for their 2004 game Fable, which would serve as the first major role-playing game on the Xbox platform. Subsequently, in 2006, MGS acquired Lionhead Studios along with the Fable properties, as it sought to secure a Fable sequel for the upcoming Xbox 360. MGS folded the staff of Digital Anvil into the larger studio in 2005, following the release of 2003's Brute Force, and closed down the studio entirely in 2006. FASA Studio was closed three-and-a-half months after the May 2007 release of their last game, Shadowrun.

In 2007, MGS announced the opening of a European office in Reading, England, headed by general manager Phil Spencer. Moore opted to leave Microsoft in July 2007, so to move back to the San Francisco Bay area with his family and to rejoin Electronic Arts. Don Mattrick was named as his replacement as the new vice-president of the Xbox and Games Business, which included MGS. Later in 2007, Bungie amicably split from MGS to become a privately held independent company, with MGS retaining the rights to the Halo property. Bungie continued to develop two additional Halo games for MGS, Halo 3: ODST (2009) and Halo: Reach (2010). Simultaneously, MGS founded 343 Industries as an internal studio to develop future Halo games without Bungie.

In 2008, MGS disbanded Carbonated Games and announced the formation of internal studio Xbox Live Productions to develop "high-quality digital content" for Xbox Live Arcade. Microsoft as a whole announced layoffs of up to 5,000 jobs across all divisions in January 2009 due to slowing sales of personal computers as a result of the late-2000s financial crisis. Within MGS, the studio had already planned to disband Ensemble Studios after the completion of Halo Wars in early 2009, while the new layoffs led MSG to also disband Aces Game Studio. Microsoft acquired Vancouver-based BigPark in May 2009, using the studio to develop some of the first games for the upcoming Kinect sensor for the Xbox 360. Later in 2009, Phil Spencer was promoted to corporate vice-president of MGS, in order to replace the retiring Shane Kim. In 2010, MGS formed a mobile gaming studio, MGS Mobile Gaming, focused on developing gaming and entertainment multimedia for Windows Phone devices. It also expanded Rare with a second studio in Digbeth, Birmingham.

As Microsoft Studios (2011–2019) 

By the Electronic Entertainment Expo 2011 in June 2011, Microsoft Game Studios was quietly renamed to Microsoft Studios. Later in 2011, Microsoft Studios acquired Twisted Pixel Games. In early December 2011, Microsoft Studios created Microsoft Casual Games, a division to revamp its past casual games for Windows (like Windows Solitaire and MSN Games) using more up-to-date software delivery platforms.

In 2012, Phil Harrison, the former Sony worldwide studios head, joined Microsoft as head of Microsoft Studios Europe and IEB. Microsoft Studios acquired developer Press Play, known for developing Tentacles and Max & the Magic Marker. They also announced a new development studio in London, England. Later in 2012, Microsoft downsized Microsoft Game Studios Vancouver due to the cancellation of the Kinect family title Project Columbia and announced that the ongoing development of free-to-play title Microsoft Flight had been ceased due to portfolio evaluation. The reduced Vancouver studios were renamed to Black Tusk Studios and tasked with making similar franchise-building title as Halo.

In 2013, Microsoft established European studio Lift London, a studio that would create cloud-based games for tablets, mobiles and TVs. Later, they created a new "Deep Tech" team inside its Developer and Platform Evangelism (DPE) unit; the new team is charged with working with top developers outside the company to build next-generation applications on top of Microsoft platforms.

While Mattrick had overseen much of the development of Microsoft's next console, the Xbox One, he left in July 2013, prior to its release, to take over as CEO of Zynga. Mattrick was succeeded by Julie Larson-Green, who was named the president of the Devices and Studios Engineering Group, following a realignment of Microsoft's divisions, overseeing both the Xbox hardware divisions and Microsoft Studios.

Shifting priorities under Microsoft CEO Satya Nadella 

Satya Nadella became CEO of Microsoft in February 2014. At this time, Microsoft was facing strong competition in the consumer market, and within the gaming sector, the Xbox One (released in 2013) was more expensive than competitors and had too much focus on non-gaming functions. Under Nadella's direction, Phil Spencer was named the new head of Microsoft Studios to replace Jason Holtman, who had only been its lead for the prior six months. Spencer began looking for ways to expand Microsoft Studios to make it a profitable division for Microsoft, and began negotiations for the acquititions of Mojang, the developers behind Minecraft, in late 2014. Microsoft spent  to acquire the studio, and upon the deal's completion in November, the studio's key founding personnel, Markus Persson, Jakob Porsér and Carl Manneh, departed Mojang. Microsoft Studios committed to keeping Minecraft available across multiple platforms, including rival PlayStation consoles. Matt Booty, the studio's corporate vice-president in 2020, said the acquisition of Mojang served as the template for later acquisitions, as Mojang was left to run as an "unplugged studio" with limited integration into the Microsoft corporation, minimizing the disruption of Mojang's normal day-to-day business matters nor impeding on the studio's freedom.

Additional intellectual property (IP) acquisitions by Microsoft Studios in 2014 included a publishing contract with Undead Labs for their game State of Decay, the rights to the Gears of War series from Epic Games, and the Rise of IP (Rise of Nations and Rise of Nations: Rise of Legends) from Big Huge Games. Microsoft Studios assigned Gears of War to Black Tusk Studios, which was later rebranded in 2015 as The Coalition.

In July 2014, it was announced that Xbox Entertainment Studios would be closed in the following months; the closure was completed by October 29. On March 4, 2015, Microsoft announced that they were merging UK-based studios, Lift London and Soho Productions for further games development, with the amalgam continuing to operate under the Lift London name. On March 7, Microsoft announced at the Game Developers Conference that HoloLens games were coming to Xbox One. On March 9, Microsoft announced that Kudo Tsunoda's role was expanding and that he would be the new studio team leader for studios such as Press Play, Lift London and a new internal studio called Decisive Games. Decisive Games was previously mentioned in job postings, saying that they were hiring for work on a "beloved strategy game" for Xbox One and PC, but this is the first public acknowledgement of the team's existence as a first-party studio. Twisted Pixel and Microsoft Studios agreed to split in September 2015.

Kudo Tsunoda left the Xbox division in November 2015 for the development of HoloLens and Microsoft Edge, and other projects that could improve means of human interaction, including voice and gesture. Tsunoda's role was filled by Hanno Lemke and Shannon Loftis. In 2016, Microsoft was perceived as "unifying PC and Xbox One" platforms. In March 2016, Microsoft canceled development of two major projects: Lionhead's Fable Legends and Press Play's Project Knoxville, shuttering both studios in the following months. Around the same time, changes to Microsoft Studios' website indicated that further studios—BigPark, Good Science Studio, Leap Experience Pioneers (LXP), Function Studios and State of the Art (SOTA)—had been closed; Microsoft Studios clarified that all of them had been consolidated into other Microsoft Studios teams over the past several years.

In September 2017, Spencer was promoted to the senior leadership team, gaining the title of "executive vice-president of gaming". At this point, Microsoft Studios directly reported to Nadella. In January 2018, Matt Booty was promoted from leader in the Minecraft games business to corporate vice-president of Microsoft Studios. On June 10, 2018, during the Electronic Entertainment Expo 2018, Microsoft announced the acquisitions of Ninja Theory, Playground Games, Undead Labs and Compulsion Games, as well as the opening of a new studio in Santa Monica, California, entitled The Initiative, which would be led by the former Crystal Dynamics studio head Darrell Gallagher. In November, Microsoft Studios announced further acquisitions with Obsidian Entertainment and inXile Entertainment.

As Xbox Game Studios (2019–present) 
The studio rebranded itself on February 5, 2019 as Xbox Game Studios, as to reflect Microsoft's intent to use the Xbox brand to support gaming across all the devices it supports. At E3 2019, Xbox Game Studios announced it had acquired Double Fine, and established a new internal studio dedicated to Age of Empires headed by Shannon Loftis, bringing their total studio count to fifteen. This studio, later named World's Edge, does not directly develop any games, but oversees efforts from external studios, such as Relic Entertainment, Forgotten Empires and Tantalus Media, to assure the series is being developed in the right direction, according to creative director Adam Isgreen.

Booty has stated that with studios like Obsidian, Ninja Theory, and Double Fine, which have traditionally supported multiplatform games, they will determine if it makes sense for their future products to be treated as Microsoft-exclusive content for Xbox and Windows computers, or to allow these to be published across multiple platforms. That decision will be based on a "network effect", whether having these games on other platforms will better support the franchise and thus worthwhile for Microsoft to help dedicate resources towards it, such as they had with Minecraft. Xbox Game Studios has allowed some of the content developed by its studios or that was previously published exclusively for the Xbox and Windows systems to be released on Nintendo systems, notably the Nintendo Switch versions of Cuphead from Studio MDHR and Ori and the Blind Forest from Moon Studios, and allowing for the titular characters from Rare's Banjo-Kazooie into Super Smash Bros. Ultimate. However, the division stated that these releases were generally "existing commitments to other platforms" that they allowed studios to honor, but they otherwise have "no plans to further expand our exclusive first party games to other consoles."

Near the end of 2019, with the combined fifteen studios now under Xbox Game Studios, Booty stated that they now had more games than ever to handle, and were likely not going to acquire any additional studios in the near future, stating "we've been shifting our focus inside Xbox Game Studios from acquisition and growth, to a phase of execution and delivery". Additionally, as Microsoft started promotion of its fourth-generation of Xbox, including the Xbox Series X, Booty stated that titles developed by Xbox Game Studios in year or two following its release will not be exclusively for the new generation of consoles, but instead will support both Xbox One and the new console, with some games receiving enhanced performance when played on the new console lineup. Booty said that with the large number of studios they had recently acquired, as well as ongoing external partnerships and their Xbox Game Pass service, the Studios are able to support a "breadth of offerings in the portfolio" designed to attract a large number of players. Further, in an interview in November 2020, Phil Spencer said during an interview regarding the future of the Xbox brand that he intends to put more focus on outputting RPGs, which had to that point been underserved.

According to Spencer, the ZeniMax acquisition was intended to give Microsoft a large library of games known around the world, and to expand the library of Xbox Game Pass and XCloud. Both U.S. and European Union regulatory agencies approved the acquisition by early March 2021, and the acquisition was formally completed by March 9, 2021. The total price of the deal was $8.1 billion Bethesda Softworks, the primarily publisher for all of ZeniMax's games, remained as an operational unit under Microsoft with the acquisition and retained all its current leadership. With the acquisition, future games from the studios will be exclusive to Xbox consoles, but existing commitments to other platforms (such as Arkane Studios' Deathloop and Tango Gameworks' Ghostwire: Tokyo, which are contractually exclusive to PlayStation 5) will still be honored. Spencer stated that Game Pass was also fundamental driver for the acquisition. A preliminary injunction to block the acquisition had been sought in an ongoing class-action lawsuit that ZeniMax faced over Fallout 4, with the plaintiffs in the case arguing that Microsoft could shield ZeniMax's assets from damages should they be found liable after the acquisition. The ZeniMax Board of Directors was dissolved following the Microsoft purchase.

On January 18, 2022, Microsoft announced its intent to acquire Activision Blizzard in an all-cash deal valued at $68.7 billion. Microsoft stated that this acquisition would make it the third-largest gaming company by revenue, following Tencent and Sony. With the announcement, Microsoft also announced a major change to its corporate structure, with Phil Spencer becoming CEO of the new division Microsoft Gaming, with Matt Booty leading Xbox Game Studios under it. Once approved, Activision Blizzard will then become a subdivision of Microsoft Gaming.

In February the United Kingdoms Competition and Markets Authority released a press statement that said "Activision deal could harm UK gamers"

Subsidiaries and divisions

Former 
 Sold or spun off
 Access Software/Salt Lake Games Studio/Indie Games — Links series — Sold to Take-Two Interactive
 Bungie — Halo series — Became independent
 Lift London — Removed from Microsoft's games business
 Twisted Pixel Games — The Gunstringer, LocoCycle, The Maw, 'Splosion Man series — Became independent
 Wingnut Interactive — Peter Jackson's joint venture game studio — Sold to WingNut Films

 Closed or consolidated
 Aces Game Studio — Microsoft Flight Simulator series — Closed
 BigPark — Kinect Joy Ride, Joy Ride Turbo — Consolidated
 Carbonated Games — Closed
 Digital Anvil — Brute Force, Freelancer — Consolidated
 Ensemble Studios — Age of Empires series, Age of Mythology series, Halo Wars — Closed
 FASA Studio — MechWarrior series, Shadowrun, Crimson Skies series — Closed
 Good Science Studio — Kinect Adventures, Kinect Fun Labs, Kinect Star Wars — Consolidated
 Hired Gun — Halo 2 PC port — Consolidated
 Lionhead Studios — Fable series, Black & White series — Closed
 Microsoft Studios Japan — Phantom Dust  — Closed
 Microsoft Studios Victoria — Closed
 Press Play — Max: The Curse of Brotherhood, Kalimba — Closed
 Team Dakota — Project Spark — Consolidated
 Xbox Entertainment Studios — Closed (TV and movie studio)
 Xbox Live Productions — Consolidated (Publishing arm)

Games published

References

External links 
 
 

 

 
2000 establishments in Washington (state)
American companies established in 2000
Companies based in Redmond, Washington
First-party video game developers
Microsoft divisions
Video game companies established in 2000
Video game companies of the United States
Video game development companies
Video game publishers
Game Studios